In New York folklore, the Hudson River Monster or "Kipsy"—the latter being a pet name presumed to have derived from Poughkeepsie—is a reputed lake monster living in the Hudson River. In 2016, Atlas Obscura ranked "Kipsy" at #17 in its list of "Lake Monsters of the United States, 'Nessies.

References

External links
 1899 New York Times article
 2006 New York Times article

Hudson River
New York (state) folklore
American legendary creatures